Luís Falcão de Mena e Silva (24 January 1902 – 3 August 1963) was a Portuguese horse rider. He competed in show jumping at the 1936 Summer Olympics and in dressage at the 1948 and 1960 Games. In 1936 he and his horse Fossette won a team bronze medal, after finishing 21st individually. In 1948 he won another team bronze medal with his horse Fascinante, and placed twelfth in the individual competition.

References

1902 births
1963 deaths
Portuguese dressage riders
Equestrians at the 1936 Summer Olympics
Equestrians at the 1948 Summer Olympics
Equestrians at the 1960 Summer Olympics
Olympic bronze medalists for Portugal
Olympic equestrians of Portugal
Portuguese male equestrians
Show jumping riders
Olympic medalists in equestrian
Medalists at the 1948 Summer Olympics
Medalists at the 1936 Summer Olympics
People from Abrantes
Sportspeople from Santarém District